Wilmersdorfer Straße is a Berlin U-Bahn station located on the  line.

The station is located under Wilmersdorfer Straße, one of Berlin's most well-known shopping districts and pedestrian zones.

It is adjacent to and considered an interchange station with Berlin-Charlottenburg station on the S-Bahn.
It was opened in 1978 and designed by Rümmler. The pattern of the tiles on the walls should resemble a lily which is on the crest of Wilmersdorf. The next station southbound is Adenauerplatz.

References

U7 (Berlin U-Bahn) stations
Buildings and structures in Charlottenburg-Wilmersdorf
Railway stations in Germany opened in 1978